Danks is a surname. People with this surname include:

Aaron Danks (born 1985), English football coach
Clayton Danks (1879–1970), Wyoming rodeo champion
Dale Danks (1939–2021), American politician and lawyer
David Miles Danks (1931–2003), Australian medical geneticist
John Danks (born 1985), American baseball pitcher
John Danks & Son, manufacturer and hardware merchant family of Melbourne, Australia
Joseph Danks (born 1962), American spree killer
Mark Danks (born 1984), English football striker
Sharon Gamson Danks, American landscape architect